An ichnotaxon (plural ichnotaxa) is "a taxon based on the fossilized work of an organism", i.e. the non-human equivalent of an artifact.

Ichnotaxa are names used to identify and distinguish morphologically distinctive ichnofossils, more commonly known as trace fossils. They are assigned genus and species ranks by ichnologists, much like organisms in Linnaean taxonomy. These are known as ichnogenera and ichnospecies, respectively. "Ichnogenus" and "ichnospecies" are commonly abbreviated as "igen." and "isp.". The binomial names of ichnospecies and their genera are to be written in italics.

Most researchers classify trace fossils only as far as the ichnogenus rank, based upon trace fossils that resemble each other in morphology but have subtle differences. Some authors have constructed detailed hierarchies up to ichnosuperclass, recognizing such fine detail as to identify ichnosuperorder and ichnoinfraclass, but such attempts are controversial.

Naming
Due to the chaotic nature of trace fossil classification, several ichnogenera hold names normally affiliated with animal body fossils or plant fossils. For example, many ichnogenera are named with the suffix -phycus due to misidentification as algae.

Edward Hitchcock was the first to use the now common -ichnus suffix in 1858, with Cochlichnus.

History
Due to trace fossils' history of being difficult to classify, there have been several attempts to enforce consistency in the naming of ichnotaxa.

In 1961, the International Commission on Zoological Nomenclature ruled that most trace fossil taxa named after 1930 would be no longer available.

See also 
 Bird ichnology
 Trace fossil classification
 Glossary of scientific naming

References

External links 
 Comments on the draft proposal to amend the Code with respect to trace fossils
 Trace Fossils - Kansas University Catalogue of Ichnotaxa

Biological classification
Trace fossils
Zoological nomenclature